Cavanaugh Bridge, also known as Jackson County Bridge #195, is a historic Pratt through truss bridge located  in Driftwood Township, Jackson County, Indiana.

Background
The structure was built in 1899 by the Lafayette Bridge Co. and spans the Muscatatuck River.  The 174 foot long steel bridge rests on native brown sandstone abutments.

It was listed on the National Register of Historic Places in 2007.

The bridge was demolished in March 2015 and replaced with a new bridge 200 yards upstream.

References

Road bridges on the National Register of Historic Places in Indiana
Bridges completed in 1899
Transportation buildings and structures in Jackson County, Indiana
National Register of Historic Places in Jackson County, Indiana
Transportation buildings and structures in Washington County, Indiana
National Register of Historic Places in Washington County, Indiana
Steel bridges in the United States
Pratt truss bridges in the United States